is a Japanese term used to refer to the founder or current Grand Master of a certain school of traditional Japanese art. It is used synonymously with the term  when it refers to the family or house that the iemoto is head of and represents.

The word  is also used to describe a system of familial generations in traditional Japanese arts such as tea ceremony (including ), Noh, calligraphy, traditional Japanese dance, traditional Japanese music, the Japanese art of incense appreciation, and Japanese martial arts.  and Go once used the  system as well.

Titles
. In English,  is often translated as "Grand Master". The 's main roles are to lead the school and protect its traditions, to be the final authority on matters concerning the school, to issue or approve licenses and certificates and, in some cases, to instruct the most advanced practitioners.

It is commonly transmitted by direct line, or by adoption. In the Urasenke tradition of tea ceremony, for example, the  carries the name "Sōshitsu". There can only be one  at the head of one school at a time, which sometimes leads to the creation of new "houses" or "lines" by those wishing to be  themselves.

Structure
Officially recognized teachers of the traditional arts that hold the position of  obtain a license to teach from the former , signifying the 's trust that the so-licensed person is capable and qualified to faithfully pass on the school's teachings. Students must also acquire licenses or certificates at various stages in their study. Depending on the school, such certificates either give the student permission to study at a particular level or affirm that the student has achieved a given level of mastery. Recipients must pay for these certificates which, at the highest level, may cost several million yen. It is also the  who authorises, selects and bestows ceremonial names for advanced practitioners.

History

As far back as the Heian period (794–1185), there were -like family lines that were responsible for passing down the secret traditions and orthodox teachings of their particular school of art, but the first appearance of the word  in extant records dates to the end of the 17th century, where it is used in reference to families entitled to have their sons become priests at great temples. Its use in the sense that it is used today, in the realm of traditional Japanese arts, starts to appear in documents in the middle of the 18th century.

Famous families and schools

Go

There were originally four main schools of Go players: Hon'inbō, Hayashi, Inoue and Yasui, alongside three minor schools: Sakaguchi, Hattori and Mizutani.

The government discontinued its support for the Go academies in 1868 as a result of the fall of the Tokugawa shogunate.

In honour of the Hon'inbō school, whose players consistently dominated the other schools during their history, one of the most prestigious Japanese Go championships is called the "Honinbo" tournament.

According to the organization  Network, there currently are 138 registered schools of small and large size.

Traditional Japanese dance
There are about 200 schools of traditional Japanese dance. The five most famous are the Hanayagi-ryū, Fujima-ryū, Wakayagi-ryū, Nishikawa-ryū, and Bandō-ryū.

Incense appreciation

Tea

Criticism and opposition
The  system has been described as rigid, expensive, nepotistic, authoritarian and undemocratic. Some groups have chosen to reject the  system. Hiroaki Kikuoka, a  player, created a presidential system for his group.  player Michiyo Yagi has rejected both the  system and the traditional style of her instrument, choosing to strike chords.

See also

References

External links
Ohara  school official site (Wayback Machine copy)
Sōgetsu  school official site (Wayback Machine copy)
Wakayagi-ryū Japanese classical dance 's official site 
: the heart of Japan

Chadō
Arts in Japan
Japanese words and phrases
History of Go